Henry Somerset, 1st Duke of Beaufort, KG, PC (162921 January 1700) was a Welsh politician who sat in the House of Commons at various times between 1654 and 1667, when he succeeded his father as 3rd Marquess of Worcester. He was styled Lord Herbert from 1644 until 3 April 1667. The Dukedom of Beaufort was bestowed upon him by King Charles II in 1682.

Early life
Henry Somerset was born at Raglan Castle in 1629, and from 1644 was styled Lord Herbert of Raglan. As a reward for the services of his father Edward, he was promised, on 1 April 1646, the hand of Princess Elizabeth, the youngest daughter of King Charles I. He left the country during the First English Civil War, but returned by 1650.

Lord Herbert
His father's estates had been forfeited, and those in Monmouthshire were held by Oliver Cromwell, but Herbert was given an allowance. Having renounced the Roman Catholic faith, which his father had held, he became acceptable to Cromwell, and was known as plain Mr. Herbert. He adopted the "republican" form of marriage before a justice of the peace in 1657. He sat in the First Protectorate Parliament as Member of Parliament for Breconshire in 1654–5.

After Cromwell's death, Herbert then joined the party that demanded a "full and free parliament", in practical terms demanding the Restoration of the House of Stuart. He was involved in the royalist plot of July 1659, and was committed to the Tower of London, whence he wrote to his wife on 20 August 1659 a letter taking a justly sanguine view of his situation.  He was released on 1 November 1659, and was elected MP for Monmouthshire and for Wootton Basset in 1660; he chose to sit for Monmouthshire in the Convention Parliament. In 1661 he was re-elected MP for Monmouthshire in the Cavalier Parliament and sat until 1667 when he inherited a peerage.

As one of the twelve commissioners from the House of Commons who attended Charles II at Breda (7 May 1660), after Charles's accession Herbert was appointed warden of the Forest of Dean (18 June), and also on 30 July, in response to appeals from local gentry, lord lieutenant of Gloucestershire, Herefordshire, and Monmouthshire. The Monmouthshire estates, which he had obtained by reversion from Cromwell, were allowed to remain in his possession, though they should strictly have reverted to his father; the latter wrote to Lord Clarendon that his son was intriguing against him.

Lord Herbert kept aloof from court life, but maintained good relations with the Hydes. In 1662 he was occupied with the demolition of the walls and fortifications at Gloucester, but the next year he pleaded for the retention of a garrison at Chepstow. In 1663 he entertained the king and queen at Badminton, Gloucestershire, an estate which he acquired by devise. Herbert was created M.A. by Oxford University on 28 September in that year. He represented Monmouthshire in the House of Commons  from 1660 to 1667, when on 3 April he succeeded his father as 3rd Marquess of Worcester.

Marquess of Worcester
Worcester was created Lord President of the Council of Wales and the Marches in April 1672, a Privy Councillor on 17 April in the same year, and was installed as a Knight of the Garter on 29 May 1672. During the Popish Plot he was forced to maintain a public attitude of complete credence in the Plot, although he was aware that at least one of the informers, William Bedloe, was in league with his enemies, notably John Arnold, to damage his career. Bedloe never dared to accuse Worcester himself; he did accuse his steward Charles Price, and some of his relatives, but his accusations were so feeble that the Government ignored them. Worcester was also troubled by the accusations of treason made against his brother-in-law William Herbert, 1st Marquis of Powis, and against Donough Kearney, an Irishman who had married his widowed stepmother, Lady Margaret O'Brien. In the event, Kearney was acquitted of treason and Lord Powis was released after five years in the Tower of London without being brought to trial.

A steady supporter of the Court party, he voted against the Exclusion Bill at the close of 1680, whereupon the Commons petitioned the king to remove him from his person and counsels (January 1681). Charles regarded his conduct in a different light.

Duke of Beaufort

By letters patent, dated 2 December 1682, the Marquess was advanced to the title of Duke of Beaufort, with reference to John Beaufort of three centuries earlier, of whom the newly created Duke was a direct male-line descendant. At about the same time, the Duke began the remodelling of his seat at Badminton. On the strength of his attitude to the Exclusion Bill, Beaufort figured prominently in John Dryden's Absalom and Achitophel as Bezaliel.

In November 1683 Beaufort obtained £20,000 damages in two libel actions against Sir Trevor Williams and John Arnold, but the judgment against the latter was partially reversed in 1690. In July 1684 he made, as president of the principality, magnificent progress through Wales, and was sumptuously entertained, among other places, at Worcester, Ludlow, and Welshpool. On 14 February 1685, along with the Duke of Somerset, he supported the Prince of Denmark as chief mourner at the funeral of Charles II. He bore the queen's crown at the coronation of James II (23 April 1685), was appointed a gentleman of the bedchamber on 16 May, and colonel of the 11th Regiment of Foot on 20 June following.

When the Duke of Monmouth, at the close of June 1685, was hesitating to march upon Bristol, Beaufort as Lord Lieutenant occupied it in force on 16 June. He threatened to fire the city if any of Monmouth's friends were admitted, and locked up a number of dissenters and disaffected persons in the Guildhall. Four days later he reviewed nineteen companies of foot and four troops of horse, and on 24 June twenty-one companies were drawn up on Redclyffe Mead and volunteers enlisted by the beat of the drum. On 6 July came tidings of Monmouth's defeat at the Battle of Sedgemoor.

On 24 September James II visited the Duke at Badminton, and expressed his satisfaction at his consistent loyalty. In October 1688, when the Glorious Revolution was proceeding, Beaufort once more occupied Bristol with the train-bands of Gloucestershire, and some of his men captured John Lovelace, 3rd Baron Lovelace (who was trying to join William of Orange) at Cirencester, and lodged him a prisoner in Gloucester Castle. He prepared to defend the city, but had eventually to surrender to the superior force under the Earl of Shrewsbury and Sir John Guise. He voted for a regency in preference to the offer of the crown to William of Orange.

On 14 December 1688 Beaufort waited on William at Windsor, but was coldly received. He nevertheless took the oaths in March 1689, and was so far reconciled as to entertain William at Badminton on 7 September 1690. In 1694 he was living in great seclusion at Chelsea, taking the waters, and absenting himself from court. Suspected of complicity in the assassination plot, his house was searched in February 1696, but nothing was found to compromise him.

Last years
On 19 March 1696, when expected to attend the House of Lords to sign the Association, Beaufort "broke his shoulder". The Lords sent him the document to sign; but he refused, though he declared his abhorrence of the plot against William. By November 1697 he was reconciled to the court, but he suffered the loss of his son and heir, Charles, through an accident to his coach in Wales in July 1698.

Beaufort died at Badminton on 21 January 1700. He was buried in the Beaufort Chapel in St. George's, Windsor, where an elaborate monument was set up to his memory; it was moved in 1878 to Badminton. Within St Michael and All Angels Church, Badminton, this monument by Grinling Gibbons is now on the North side of the chancel and consists of an effigy of the Duke in Garter robes, reclining on a sarcophagus and a plinth with relief of St George and the Dragon. There are twin Corinthian columns with embossed shafts, acanthus frieze, cornice with flaming urns, and the Duke's arms and supporters. At the top, 25 ft from the ground, is a tasselled cushion supporting a coronet; on the plinth are full-length female figures of Justice and Truth. Above the Duke's effigy, parted curtains show the heavenly host with palms and crowns. The Latin inscription displays the names of his family and the many offices he held.

Roger North, in his Life of the Lord Keeper, gave an account of the state maintained by Beaufort: "a princely way of living" with a household of about 200. The Duke spent much time hunting, planting, and building, and was unfashionably strict: his servants lived in constant fear of dismissal, and even neighbouring landowners were reluctant to cross him.

Family

On 17 August 1657, he married Mary Capell, who was the daughter of Arthur Capell, 1st Baron Capell of Hadham, sister of Arthur Capell, 1st Earl of Essex, and widow of Henry Seymour, Lord Beauchamp. They had five sons and four daughters. Three of the sons were:
 Henry, who died as an infant;
 Charles (December 166013 July 1698), who had a military and political career and succeeded him as Marquess of Worcester;
 Arthur (29 September 1671July 1743), who married Mary Russell in 1695, daughter of William Russell, 1st and last Bt., and Hesther Rouse, daughter of Sir Thomas Rouse, 1st Bt. (1608–1676). Their daughter was Mary Somerset, grandmother of Sir Charles William Rouse Boughton, 1st and 9th Bt.
Three of the daughters were:
 Mary, Lady of the Bedchamber, who was married to James Butler, 2nd Duke of Ormonde as his second wife, and became the mother of one son and two daughters;
 Henrietta, who was married twice, first to Henry Horatio O'Brien, Lord Ibrackan, with whom she had one son, the 8th Earl of Thomond, and three daughters, and secondly to Henry Howard, 6th Earl of Suffolk as his second wife
 Anne (1673–1763), who married Thomas Coventry, 2nd Earl of Coventry, and became the mother of one son.
The fourth daughter—bearing an unknown name—might have died young.

Beaufort's son Charles died before he could inherit the dukedom, so on the duke's death it passed to Charles's son Henry.

Family tree

Ancestry

Notes

References

References
 Burke's Peerage and Baronetage (106th edition, 1999) edited by Charles Mosley
 Page on the Dukedom of Beaufort from Michael Moore's website HereditaryTitles.com
 Molly McClain, Beaufort: The Duke and His Duchess, 1657-1715 (Yale University Press, 2001).

Attribution

Further reading

|-

|-

|-

|-

|-

1629 births
1700 deaths
Devonshire Regiment officers
101
09
Knights of the Garter
Lord-Lieutenants of Gloucestershire
Lord-Lieutenants of Herefordshire
Lord-Lieutenants of Monmouthshire
Lord-Lieutenants of Wales
Masters of foxhounds in England
Members of the Privy Council of England
Henry Somerset, 01st Duke of Beaufort
Converts to Anglicanism from Roman Catholicism
English MPs 1660
English MPs 1661–1679
Members of the Parliament of England (pre-1707) for constituencies in Wales
Burials at St George's Chapel, Windsor Castle